Konstantinos Ipirotis (born 5 December 1975) is a Greek retired football midfielder.

References

1975 births
Living people
Greek footballers
Aris Thessaloniki F.C. players
Panserraikos F.C. players
Panathinaikos F.C. players
OFI Crete F.C. players
Fostiras F.C. players
Ethnikos Asteras F.C. players
ILTEX Lykoi F.C. players
APOP Kinyras FC players
Super League Greece players
Cypriot First Division players
Association football midfielders
Greek expatriate footballers
Expatriate footballers in Cyprus
Greek expatriate sportspeople in Cyprus